Oxford Falls is a suburb of northern Sydney, in the state of New South Wales, Australia 20 kilometres north-east of the Sydney central business district in the local government area of Northern Beaches Council. Oxford Falls is part of the Northern Beaches region and also considered to be part of the Forest District, colloquially known as The Forest.

History
Alexander Bowen was granted  here in 1878, which he named Bloodwood Gully. Oxford Falls was gazetted as the name of the suburb in 1902. Wakehurst Parkway is named after John de Vere Loder, 2nd Baron Wakehurst, the Governor of New South Wales (1937–1946).

Oxford Falls Post Office opened on 2 January 1924 and closed in 1984.

Landmarks
The Oxford Falls are two waterfalls on Middle Creek, which flows north to meet Oxford Creek. Meandering Creek flows into Middle Creek. Wheeler Creek forms part of the border with Cromer. Garigal National Park borders the  suburb, to the north.

Commercial areas
Reclaimed Building Material Yard on Meatworks Road

Schools and churches
 Oxford Falls Grammar School
St Pius X College
 Christian City Church, Oxford Falls

Sport and recreation
Oxford Falls has a number of trails suitable for mountain bike riding including downhill and free-ride trails.
 Oxford Falls Peace Park
St Pius X College Playing Fields
Australian Tennis Academy
Warringah Radio Control Society flying field

References

External links
 The Northern Beaches Mountain Biking Group (NoBMoB) have details of trails in Oxford Falls
 Oxford Falls Action Group (OFAG) fighting to preserve the valley for future generations.

Suburbs of Sydney
Northern Beaches Council